The Spokane Spokes were a minor league professional ice hockey team that operated from 1958-1959 in the Western Hockey League.

After the 1958-1959 season the team was renamed Spokane Comets.

Roster

 C Gene "Max" Mekilok 
 LW/C Earl "Ching" Johnson 
 RW Al Johnson 
 C Del Topoll 
 RW Nelson "Blinky" Boyce 
 C Bev Bell 
 C Walter Bradley  
 D Joe Lund 
 D Tom Hodges 
 C Lloyd Maxfield 
 RW Ron Attwell 
 D Benny Woit 
 RW Buddy Bodman 
 D Jack Lancien 
 W Art Hart 
 C Frank Kubasek 
 D Tom Williams 
 D Harry Smith 
 D Lionel Repka 
 D Connie Madigan 
 D George Ferguson 
 F Lorne Nadeau 
 D Bob Duncan 
 G Emile Francis

Spokes Alumni

 Emile Francis - New York Rangers and St. Louis Blues coach, later GM and member of Hockey Hall of Fame

References

Defunct ice hockey teams in the United States
Western Hockey League (1952–1974) teams